Richard Harman may refer to:

Richard Harman (cricketer) (1859–1927), New Zealand architect and sportsman
Richard Harman (journalist), New Zealand television current affairs broadcaster
Richard Harman (politician) (c. 1621–1646), English politician
Richard James Strachan Harman (1826–1902), a Founding Father of Canterbury Province, New Zealand
Richard Strachan De Renzy Harman (1896–1953), New Zealand architect

See also
Richard Harman Reeves (1836–1910) New Zealand politician
Richard Harmon (born 1991), Canadian actor